The Decennial Air Cruise was a mass transatlantic flight from Orbetello, Italy, to  the Century of Progress International Exposition, Chicago, Illinois. The expedition, organized by the Italian Regia Aeronautica, began on July 1, 1933, and ended on August 12 of the same year. It consisted of 25 Savoia-Marchetti S.55X seaplanes crossing the Atlantic Ocean in formation, forming the greatest mass flight in aviation history. The Italian Squadrons, led by General Italo Balbo, were welcomed enthusiastically in the Netherlands, the UK, Iceland, Canada and particularly in the United States of America, where they became known as the Italian Air Armada. A publicity success for Fascist Italy, Balbo further viewed the expedition as a pioneering step towards commercial flights across the Atlantic.

Context 
International public opinion in the early 1930s was fascinated by the progress of aviation, with attempts to fly across the ocean widely covered by the media. Pilots such as Francesco De Pinedo were so popular internationally that monuments were dedicated to them abroad. Even minor details of flights, such as delays due to bad weather, were covered by the international press. Aviation was the domain of heroes rather than part of normal daily life.  

In 1928, when he was appointed General of the Air Force, Balbo was determined to make Italy the most advanced country in the world when it comes to aviation. Being opposed to the stardom of individual pilots common at the time, he wanted each of them to develop a sense of belonging to a larger organization, the Air Force.

Balbo was very fond of the United States, and was motivated to establish a "permanent link" between the Italian and the American aviation. He was "delighted" by the way he was received during his visit in 1929 and hoped to fly back there.

Between 1928 and 1931, three Italian mass flights took place, one per year: across the Western Mediterranean, the Eastern Mediterranean, and one crossing the Southern Atlantic Ocean.

The 1928 cruise featured 51 Savoia-Marchetti_S.59 bis flying boats, and was the first long flight with more than 8 planes in formation. The planes, departing from Orbetello, made six stops: Elmas (Sardinia, Italy), Pollença (Balearic Islands, Spain), Los Alcázares (Spain), Berre (France) and Orbetello. The event resulted in international recognition, particularly in Spain and France. Multiple Savoia-Marchetti airplanes were bought worldwide, convincing Balbo of the commercial and publicity value of these undertakings.

The aerial cruise to the Eastern Mediterranean in 1929 had an even wider publicity outcome, partially because of a picture of Balbo and Red Army officers saluting the Red Flag that widely circulated in the international press. The route was: Orbetello, Taranto, Athens, Istanbul, Varna (Bulgaria), Odessa (then Soviet Union), and the planes used this time were 40.

Since 1929, the goal of Balbo was to cross the North Atlantic in formation, an enterprise considered not yet feasible at that time. As a preparatory step to eventually reach that goal, it was decided to organize a mass flight across the South Atlantic.

In 1930 Italy organized the first of the two Atlantic cruises which made Balbo rise to international fame. This time Balbo led 12 aircraft and 50 men across the Southern Atlantic from Orbetello to Rio de Janeiro. Crossing the Southern Atlantic was considered easier because of more predictable weather patterns. The flight took place between 17 December 1930 and 15 January 1931, making the news worldwide. Balbo wrote an account of the expedition for the New York Times.

Up to 1933, the history of transatlantic flights recorded only 28 successful attempts out of 78 to cross the Northern Atlantic, all of which individual flights. A mass formation crossing had never been tried before. The ten years anniversary of the March on Rome (1922–1932) was deemed by the Italian government the right occasion to attempt the mass flight, hence the expedition was dubbed Decennial Air Cruise. Although the organization of the flight took longer than expected, ending in 1933, the name was kept in celebration of another decennial, the establishment of the Royal Italian Air Force (1923–1933).

Preparations 
It was decided to double the number of aircraft and men that took part in the earlier transatlantic flight: this time 24 aircraft and 100 men were to be employed.

The initial plan was to fly around the world through: the Mediterranean, the Persian Gulf, India, China, Japan, Kuril Islands, Kamchatka Krai, Aleutian Islands, Alaska, California, Panama, Florida, New York, Newfoundland, Ireland, and Italy. Captain Enea Silvio Recagno was sent to the Aleutian Islands and Kamchatka Karin in May 1931 to explore the area, and he singled out Attu Island as the most appropriate base for the squadrons. The plan had to be discarded due to the Japanese invasion of Manchuria and the cost, deemed too high by Balbo given the financial crisis. Not willing to abandon the idea of pursuing the North Atlantic route, Balbo decided that the Italian planes had to reach the International Exposition in Chicago, whose motto A Century of Progress he considered particularly suitable.

Recagno was sent once again to survey the area, this time to Greenland, in April 1932. Travelling by motorboat from Godthaab to Julianehaab, he studied the meteorology of the area as well as its geography, and identified a lake in the proximity of Julianehaab as a potential base for a water landing in Greenland. 
 
Captain Renato Abbriata instead reached Cartwright, Newfoundland and Labrador with some difficulties. Having travelled to St. John's, he met an American aviator who took him to Cartwright on a small de Havilland Moth airplane. The American died while flying on his way back, and was described by Balbo as a "glorious victim in the cause of aviation and of human solidarity". Abbriata spent three weeks in Cartwright, gathering meteorological data and studying the coast.

Major Stefano Cagna, very much trusted by Balbo and an important participant in all previous mass flights, was considered the best candidate to plan the European leg of the expedition. During his exploratory flight, Cagna flew from Orbetello to Reykjavík via Amsterdam and Derry on a S55, the same flying boat used for the transatlantic flight.

Balbo organized the Transoceanic Fliers Conference of 1932 in Rome, with the goal of gathering as much information as possible for the upcoming expedition. He also thought that the conference would have proved useful to establish a regular airplane service between Europe and the Americas in the future.

Recruiting and training the pilots at the Scuola di navigazione aerea d'alto mare (SNADAM), established specifically for the expedition and led by General Aldo Pellegrini, took two years. Seventy officers were recruited, most of which young. About a dozen veterans of the expedition to Brazil were also chosen, in order to mentor and inspire the younger officers. The practical part of the training included the expertise required to handle a flying boat on water such as sailing, as well as waves and wind movement. The winter of 1932/1933 was spent mountaineering in Misurina to prepare the men for the skills that might have been needed in case of water landing at extreme northern latitudes. The aviators learned about the various components of the seaplanes directly at the factories producing them. On the academic side, the officers took courses in mathematics, physics, aerodynamics, thermodynamics, English, and navigation. The training was hard: half of the original applicants failed and got replaced.
The SM.55, which already proved its reliability during the Brazil and Eastern Mediterranean expedition, was chosen once again. Differently from all previous flights, the engine of choice this time was the Isotta Fraschini Asso 11R.

In May 1933 the expedition was nearly ready to depart, but had to wait for weather conditions to improve over the Alps and northcentral Europe.

The North Atlantic route 

With the weather finally cleared during the night of June 30 to July 1, Balbo set reveille at 4:15 AM for the first leg of the flight between Orbetello and Amsterdam. The aircraft flew over the Alps in formation, and after seven hours reached Amsterdam. In the Dutch city, a large number of journalists and sightseers was waiting for the water landing, during which Sergeant Mechanic Ugo Quintavalla lost his life. The seaboat flipped over, likely due to an error made by the pilot of the I-DINI aircraft Captain Mario Baldini. While three of the crew and a passenger were saved, Quintavalla died trapped in the wreckage. In Amsterdam the aviators were welcomed with public ceremonies and Balbo was given the keys to the city. In a message to Mussolini, portrayed in an American cartoon, Balbo said: "They gave us everything but rest and sleep".

The second leg of the flight took place the day after from Amsterdam to Derry, covering the 625 miles between the two cities in 6 hours and 12 minutes. The Italian aviators traveled on a Royal Air Force speedboat through cheering crowds and were received by the Mayor at Guild Hall.

On July 5 the Armada flew from Derry to Reykjavík, encountering heavy fog for about half an hour. By dropping to an altitude of 30 meters, at which the waves were visible, they managed to fly past the fog and eventually reach the Icelandic capital safely at 6PM. Thousands of Icelanders assembled at the waterfront to welcome the airmen.

After 6 days in Reykjavík due to bad weather, on July 12 the squadrons took off with destination Cartwright, the hardest leg of the journey. In case of difficulties, the aircraft could have stopped half-way through in Julianehaab at the repair and supply depot prepared at the location identified by Captain Enea Silvio Recagno during the preparations. That was unnecessary however, and after 12 hours of flight the expedition reached Canada; the number of aviators that successfully crossed the Norther Atlantic went from 28 to 127. The six hours flight from Cartwright to Shediac was uneventful amid good weather. In Shediac, where at the time the population was around 10,000, a crowd of 30,000 awaited the Italians.

On July 14 the Armada covered the distance between Shediac and Montréal in about five hours. The flight in this case was almost entirely above land, meaning that the aviators had to rely entirely on the engines as emergency water landings were not possible. At his arrival in Longueuil Balbo was furious because of various small boats flitting about in the area where the armada had to land. As a newsman approached him with a microphone, Balbo let fly a few "unparliamentary invectives", which he thought might have gone through on the radio. In Montréal the Italians were welcomed by Canadian Minister of Marine Alfred Duranleau.

During the flight between Montréal and Chicago, due to a storm above Lake Erie, the planned route had to be changed and moved 100 km north towards the Nottawasaga River, Detroit, Lake Huron and Toledo. The aviators reached Chicago on July 15, led by Balbo's aircraft which landed at 6PM CDT on Lake Michigan. The armada was escorted by 42 planes from Selfridge Field, Michigan. While the Italian SM.55 glided down in turn, the US Army planes in formation spelled "Italia" over the heads of the crowds. Balbo was welcomed by Admiral Wat Tyler Cluverius Jr., the Mayor of Chicago Edward Joseph Kelly and other dignitaries.
The aviators left Chicago Harbor at 12:43 GMT on July 19 escorted by 36 American fighter planes till Toledo. They then reached Angola at 14:10, Cleveland at 15:25, and around 17 the Italians flew above Niagara Falls. After having sighted the Hudson River at 19:20, Balbo spotted Manhattan and the Italian . Balbo's squadron touches water in Jamaica Bay, New York City at 20:00.

Response in the United States 

In Chicago, a crowd of more than 100,000 gathered to cheer the arrival of Balbo's fleet on the evening of July 15. During dinner at the Stevens Hotel, former judge John Sbarbaro read a message from President of the United States Franklin D. Roosevelt. Speakers at the event included the Governor of Illinois Henry Horner, Mayor Kelly,  and the president of Century of Progress Rufus C. Dawes. Leaflets attacking Balbo signed by the Italian Socialist Federation circulated around the fair area. The arrival of the Italians and Balbo's speeches were broadcast by The National Broadcasting Company. Loyola University Chicago awarded Balbo an honorary degree, July 15 was proclaimed Italo Balbo Day and on July 17 Chicago's Seventh Street was renamed Balbo Avenue. Balbo received a gold key to the city from Mayor Kelly. United States Commissioner to the Century of Progress Exposition Harry Stewart New said that if Balbo remained in the US he might be elected president. In a ceremony that Balbo found particularly strange, he was initiated into the Sioux tribe as "Chief Flying Eagle". Being very cautious about his public image, Balbo was unsure whether to accept, and agreed only after hearing that former US President Calvin Coolidge also received such an honor.

The Italians were "hailed by millions" on their arrival in New York City according to the front page of the New York Times of July 20. 1500 persons watched the arrival of the planes from the Empire State Building. Balbo was quoted saying that "New York's welcome exceeded all expectations, more so even than Chicago's". On July 20 Balbo was invited by Roosevelt to lunch at the White House, where he went with a select group of his most senior aviators. The President offered his personal congratulations and tried to persuade Balbo to prolong his stay in the US to start a countrywide tour. Balbo enjoyed the lunch with Roosevelt, which he found to be "very cordial and direct in his manners, like all Americans". A crowd of 60,000 attended the celebrations at Madison Square Garden. The city of New York organized a parade down Broadway on motorcycle escort on July 21 which made a great impression on Balbo, who said "in our lives it would be extraordinary to experiment something as grandiose again".

The South Atlantic route back to Italy 
Balbo and the Armada left New York City on July 25 with destination Shediac, and one day later they flew to Shoal Harbour. According to the plan, they were supposed to spend a couple of days there and then reach Valentia Island, Ireland with one single 3000 km flight on July 29.  An alternative route had to be considered due to heavy storms across the North Atlantic flight path that carried on for multiple days, as well as fog banks over Ireland. While various options were being studied, Mussolini tried to ensure that Balbo would avoid London, Paris, or Berlin, afraid of being overshadowed by his rising popularity.

On August 8, after two weeks spent in Shoal Harbour (where meanwhile a street was renamed Balbo Drive), a decision was made and the expedition flew 2700 km to the Azores. Given that in the Azores no bay was deemed large enough for all the aircraft, 15 sea boats landed at Ponta Delgada, and the remaining 9 at Horta. From the Azores, the squadrons took off to Lisbon on August 9. During take off from Ponta Delgada, the I-RANI aircraft overturned, causing the death of Lieutenant Enrico Squaglia. Balbo, who anticipated difficulties taking off from the Azores, was not aware of the death of Squaglia till the arrival in Lisbon. All ceremonies in Lisbon were cancelled. The Armada covered the last 2200 km of its trip and reached Rome on August 12.

Aftermath 

On 15 July 1934, one year after the flight, a Roman column sent by Mussolini to commemorate the event was unveiled in Chicago: Balbo Monument. To celebrate 40 years of the expedition, 58 of the surviving member of the flight together with Paolo Balbo, son of Italo, went to Chicago for Columbus Day in 1973. They paraded through the streets with Mayor Richard J. Daley and the Governor of Illinois Dan Walker, an event attended by about 10,000.

References  
 

Transatlantic flight
1933 in aviation